Stenocrepis is a genus of beetles in the family Carabidae, containing the following 31 species:

 Stenocrepis aeruginea (Laferte-Senectere, 1851) 
 Stenocrepis angustipennis Chaudoir in Oberthür, 1883 
 Stenocrepis cayennensis (Buquet, 1834) 
 Stenocrepis cuprea (Chaudoir, 1843) 
 Stenocrepis duodecimstriata (Chevrolat, 1835) 
 Stenocrepis elegans (Leconte, 1851) 
 Stenocrepis flavicrus (Laferte-Senectere, 1851) 
 Stenocrepis fuscipes (Laferte-Senectere, 1851) 
 Stenocrepis gilvipes Chaudoir in Oberthür, 1883 
 Stenocrepis gratiosa (Bates, 1882) 
 Stenocrepis guerini Chaudoir In Oberthür, 1883 
 Stenocrepis insulana (Jacquelin Du Val, 1857) 
 Stenocrepis laevigata (Dejean, 1831) 
 Stenocrepis leprieurii (Buquet, 1834) 
 Stenocrepis marginella (Perty, 1830) 
 Stenocrepis metallica (Dejean, 1826) 
 Stenocrepis mexicana (Chevrolat, 1835) 
 Stenocrepis nigricornis (Laferte-Senectere, 1851) 
 Stenocrepis olivacea (Bates, 1878) 
 Stenocrepis pallipes (Brulle, 1838) 
 Stenocrepis palustris Darlington, 1935 
 Stenocrepis pauper Chaudoir, 1857 
 Stenocrepis punctatostriata (Brulle, 1838) 
 Stenocrepis quatuordecimsulcata Emden, 1949 
 Stenocrepis robusta (Brulle, 1838) 
 Stenocrepis sahlbergii Chaudoir, 1857 
 Stenocrepis sinuata Chaudoir in Oberthür, 1883 
 Stenocrepis subdepressa Darlington, 1934 
 Stenocrepis tibialis (Chevrolat, 1834) 
 Stenocrepis triaria Chaudoir in Oberthür, 1883 
 Stenocrepis viridula Chaudoir, 1857

References

Licininae